Deren is a given name. Notable people with the name include:
 Deren, Dundgovi, a sum (district) of Dundgovi Province in southern Mongolia

Surname 
 Mark Paul Deren, (born 1980), American artist and designer
 Maya Deren (1917–1961), American filmmaker and film theorist

Given name 
 Deren Ibrahim (born 1991), Gibraltarian footballer
 Deren Ney, American musician
 Xia Deren (born 1955), Chinese politician

See also
 
 Derren
 Van Deren, a surname